1,2-Dibromopropane, also known as propylene dibromide, is an organic compound with the formula CHCHBrCHBr.  It is the simplest chiral hydrocarbon containing two bromine atoms:

References
1,2-Dibromo Propane also known as Propylene bromide is a naturally occurring organic compound. It is part of the Vicinal Dihalide family; it is highly unstable due to both torsional strain and its highly electrophilic nature.

Bromoalkanes